Bunkovce is a village and municipality in the Sobrance District in the Košice Region of east Slovakia.

History
In historical records the village was first mentioned in 1358.

Geography
The village lies at an altitude of 106 metres and covers an area of 7.79 km².
It has a population of about 335 people.

Culture
The village has a soccer pitch.

Genealogical resources

The records for genealogical research are available at the state archive "Statny Archiv in Presov, Slovakia"

 Greek Catholic church records (births/marriages/deaths): 1834–1895 (parish B)

See also
 List of municipalities and towns in Slovakia

External links
 
http://en.e-obce.sk/obec/bunkovce/bunkovce.html
https://web.archive.org/web/20071217080336/http://www.statistics.sk/mosmis/eng/run.html
https://web.archive.org/web/20131102120940/http://www.bunkovce.sk/
Surnames of living people in Bunkovce

Villages and municipalities in Sobrance District